"The Wicked Messenger" is a song written and originally performed by Bob Dylan for his  album John Wesley Harding.  The song was recorded at Columbia's Studio A, Nashville, on November 29, 1967.

Structure and instrumentation 
The song's instrumentation is light, a characteristic shared with the rest of John Wesley Harding. It features a repetitive descending bass line that carries the song, and the most prominent instrument used is Bob Dylan's acoustic guitar.

Lyrics 
The lyrics have their origins in the Bible. In his book, Wicked Messenger: Bob Dylan and the 1960s, Mike Marqusee writes:

Dylan was studying the Bible at the time, and he used many biblical reference in the songs on the John Wesley Harding album. His mother, Beatty Zimmerman, revealed in an interview at this time:

The song revolves around a character, a "wicked messenger", who has been sent by Eli, a priest in the Books of Samuel. For the critic Andy Gill, "this eponymous messenger is, of course, Dylan himself, the bringer of harsh truths". The lyrics are somewhat opaque ("When questioned who had sent for him/He answered with his thumb/For his tongue it could not speak but only flatter"), and the song ends with a sardonic, slightly cryptic moral, "And he was told but these few words/Which opened up his heart/"If ye cannot bring good news, then don't bring any" perhaps a reference to 2 Samuel 4:10.

Gill's interpretation of the song is that the high priest Eli was one of the more intellectual figures in the Old Testament. To have been sent by Eli implies a reliance on intellect. Gill suggests that "perhaps Dylan felt he had valued rationality too highly over spirituality."

Live performances
According to his website, Dylan performed the song more than 125 times in concert between its live debut in 1987 and its most recent performance in 2021.

Cover versions
The song has been covered by over a dozen artists, notably Faces on their 1970 album First Step; Patti Smith on her 1996 album Gone Again; and The Black Keys for the I'm Not There soundtrack  in 2007.

Notes

References

 
 

1967 songs
Songs written by Bob Dylan
Bob Dylan songs
Faces (band) songs
Song recordings produced by Bob Johnston